Shepelevo is a rural locality (a village) in Yagnitskoye Rural Settlement, Cherepovetsky District, Vologda Oblast, Russia. The population was 41 as of 2002.

Geography 
Shepelevo is located 109 km south of Cherepovets (the district's administrative centre) by road. Nikulino is the nearest rural locality.

References 

Rural localities in Cherepovetsky District